Ernest Anthony Gonzales II (born October 10, 1980) is an American politician and United States Navy veteran who has served as the U.S. representative for Texas's 23rd congressional district in the United States House of Representatives since 2021. He is a member of the Republican Party.

Early life and education
Gonzales was raised in San Antonio, Devine, and Camp Wood, Texas. He earned an Associate of Arts from Chaminade University, a Bachelor of Science from Excelsior College, a graduate certificate in legislative studies from Georgetown University, and a Master of Arts from American Public University. He is in a PhD program at the University of Southern Mississippi, where he has specialized in international development, security studies, and international politics.

Early career
From 1999 to 2019, Gonzales served in the United States Navy, retiring with the rank of Master Chief Petty Officer. A trained cryptologist, Gonzales was deployed to Iraq and Afghanistan. He was also stationed in Tampa, Florida; Pensacola, Florida; Kāneʻohe Bay; and San Antonio, and assigned to the United States Navy Office of Legislative Affairs.

Gonzales served as a Department of Defense fellow in the office of Senator Marco Rubio and also worked as an assistant professor of political science at the University of Maryland.

U.S. House of Representatives

Elections

2020 

Gonzales ran for Texas's 23rd congressional district in the 2020 election. The seat was open, as three-term Republican incumbent Will Hurd did not seek reelection. In the Republican primary, Gonzales narrowly defeated Raul Reyes after a recount. During the primary, Gonzales was endorsed by Hurd and President Donald Trump. In the November general election, Gonzales defeated Democratic nominee Gina Ortiz Jones. The result was considered an upset, as most forecasters believed that the Democrats were favored to flip the district after Hurd announced his retirement. Gonzales's term in office began on January 3, 2021.

Tenure
Gonzales, along with all other Senate and House Republicans, voted against the American Rescue Plan Act of 2021.

On May 19, 2021, Gonzales was one of 35 Republicans who joined all Democrats in voting to approve legislation to establish the January 6, 2021 commission meant to investigate the storming of the U.S. Capitol.

He was censured by the State Republican Executive Committee of the Texas Republican Party on March 4, 2023 for failing to vote in line with the party positions, citing his decision to support the Bipartisan Safer Communities Act and the Respect for Marriage Act (both in 2022) as well as his vote against a House rules packages passed after the contested 2023 Speaker election.

Committee assignments
Committee on Appropriations
Subcommittee on Military Construction, Veterans Affairs, and Related Agencies
Subcommittee on Transportation, Housing and Urban Development, and Related Agencies

Caucus memberships
Problem Solvers Caucus
Republican Study Committee

Party leadership
Assistant Republican Whip (2021–present)

Political positions

Abortion
Gonzales describes himself as pro-life. He co-sponsored the No Taxpayer Funding for Abortion and Abortion Insurance Full Disclosure Act of 2021 (H.R. 18), which aims to codify the Hyde Amendment banning federal funding for abortions.

Cybersecurity
Gonzales has cited cybersecurity as "a top priority in Congress" and has supported increased funding for Texan infrastructure against acts of cyberterrorism or ransomware.

Foreign policy
During the Russo-Ukrainian War, Gonzales signed a letter advocating for President Biden to give F-16 fighter jets to Ukraine.

Gun rights
Gonzales supported amending the 2021 National Defense Authorization Act to remove a proposed red flag law provision. He and other House Republicans signed a letter that argued the provision would infringe on Second Amendment rights and allow "military judges and magistrates to issue military court gun confiscation orders."

After the Robb Elementary School shooting in Gonzales's Congressional district, Gonzales voted for the Bipartisan Safer Communities Act and cited his experience growing up in an abusive household (including an instance of his father threatening his mother with a gun) as his reason for supporting the act.

Immigration
Gonzales supports keeping Title 42 expulsion in place and, along with Senators John Cornyn and Ted Cruz, wrote to Department of Homeland Security Secretary Alejandro Mayorkas and Department of Health and Human Services Secretary Xavier Becerra arguing that the removal of Title 42 would encourage illegal immigration at the southern border.

In 2022, Gonzales argued that while the Remain in Mexico policy enacted by the Trump administration had flaws, it had been an effective strategy to prevent illegal immigration and asylum fraud and that repealing laws on illegal immigration and off-soil asylum processing had led to cases such as the trailer deaths in San Antonio earlier that year. In response to the repeal of the Remain in Mexico policy under Biden, Gonzales called for an increase in immigration judges to process asylum cases "in days, not years." He supports the expansion and simplification of work visas to reform legal immigration.

LGBT rights
On July 19, 2022, Gonzales and 46 other House Republicans voted for the Respect for Marriage Act, which would repeal the Defense of Marriage Act, require each state to recognize any marriage performed in another state, and codify same-sex marriage and Obergefell v. Hodges into federal law.

Personal life
Gonzales and his wife, Angel, have six children. Angel served as the treasurer and custodian of records for Gonzales's campaign. He is a Roman Catholic.

Electoral history

See also 
List of Hispanic and Latino Americans in the United States Congress

References

External links
Official website
Campaign website

|-

|-

1980 births
American politicians of Mexican descent
Candidates in the 2020 United States elections
Georgetown University alumni
Hispanic and Latino American members of the United States Congress
Living people
People from Devine, Texas
People from San Antonio
Republican Party members of the United States House of Representatives from Texas
United States Navy sailors
University of Southern Mississippi alumni
Latino conservatism in the United States
Catholics from Texas
Catholic politicians from Texas